Derrick Wright (born 1928) is a British author specializing in military history and particularly battles in the Pacific against the Japanese in World War II.  He grew up in Teesside, an area in the North East of England, which was repeatedly bombed by German forces during the war. After completing his National Service in the British Army during the late 1940s, he went on to become an ultrasonics engineer. After his retirement, he was able to fully indulge his fascination in World War II. One of his books, The Battle for Iwo Jima, has been translated into Spanish.

Works
 The Battle for Iwo Jima – 1945, Derrick Wright, Sutton Publishing, 2003 
 Tarawa 1943: A Hell of a Way to Die
 Tarawa: The Turning of the Tide
 Iwo Jima: The marines raise the flag on Mt Suribachi
 To the Far Side of Hell – the battle for Peleliu, 1944

References

External links
 Review of To the Far Side of Hell by Neal Ferguson, University of Nevada

1928 births
British writers
Living people